Enderby Outside, first published in 1968 in London by William Heinemann, is the second volume in the Enderby series of comic novels by Anthony Burgess.

Plot summary

After a suicide attempt at the very end of Inside Mr. Enderby, the second novel opens with the protagonist under psychiatric care and working as a bartender at a large London hotel. Under the name of 'Hogg' (his stepmother's maiden name, we learn), he is persuaded to renounce the creation of poetry as an adolescent preoccupation and to pursue useful work.

Hogg-Enderby, bereft of his stock of capital and now divorced, is forced to earn his keep and finds that the poetic muse has left him. He also finds that his work has been plagiarised, again, by a certain rock singer named Yod Crewsey - whose band, the Crewsey Fixers, are managed and groomed by his former wife.

After being implicated in the public murder of Crewsey during a banquet at the hotel, Enderby-Hogg goes on the run to Morocco - to the bar of a rival poet named Rawcliffe. Assuming control and ownership of Rawcliffe's property upon his death, and the death of his 'Hogg' persona, Enderby realises that his muse is returning.

Novels by Anthony Burgess
1968 British novels
British comedy novels
Novels set in hotels
Novels set in Morocco
Heinemann (publisher) books